Černilov is a municipality and village in Hradec Králové District in the Hradec Králové Region of the Czech Republic. It has about 2,400 inhabitants.

Administrative parts
Villages of Bukovina and Újezd are administrative parts of Černilov.

History
The first written mention of Černilov is from 1271.

References

External links

Villages in Hradec Králové District